Gameren is a village in the Dutch province of Gelderland.

Gameren was a separate municipality until 1955, when it was merged with Kerkwijk.

History 
The village was first mentioned in 1146 as Gamberem, and means "settlement on the Gamber (river)". Gameren developed into a stretched out esdorp along the Waal. The Protestant Church dates from around 1860, and in 1920 a clergy house was attached to the church. In 1840, Gameren was home to 1,042 people. In 2004, many members of the Reformed Church did not want to join the united Protestant Church, and formed the Restored Reformed Church. In 2014, they opened their own church building without approximately 350 seats.

Gallery

References

Populated places in Gelderland
Former municipalities of Gelderland
Zaltbommel